Anne Elizabeth "Holly" Woods (born August, 4 1953) is an American rock singer whose notable works include five albums in the rock band Toronto.

Biography 
A native of Durham, North Carolina, Woods moved from San Francisco to Toronto in the mid-1970s, after fronting local bands Sass, and then Gambler.  She initially performed in Toronto as Annie Woods and Shivers. She was introduced to Brian Allen in 1977 and, with the addition of Scott Kreyer, Nick Costello and Jimmy Fox (all native New Yorkers), plus Sheron Alton, the band Toronto was formed.

After a string of Top 40 hits and nearly 700,000 albums sold, Toronto disbanded in 1985. In 1986, Woods and Kreyer regrouped and recorded a new album which was never released. In 2007, "lost" masters were discovered and released as the eight-song album Live It Up! These songs were recorded in Atlanta, in 1986, with producer Sonny Limbo and bandmate Kreyer.

Discography

Albums
 Lookin' for Trouble (1980) as Toronto
 Head On (1981) as Toronto
 Get It on Credit (1982) as Toronto
 Girls' Night Out (1983) as Toronto
 Greatest Hits (1984) as Toronto
 Assault and Flattery (1984) as Holly Woods & Toronto
 Live It Up! (2007) as Holly Woods

Singles
 1980 - "Even the Score" [CAN #44] [CHUM #14]
 1980 - "Lookin' for Trouble" [CAN #73]
 1982 - "Your Daddy Don't Know" [CAN #3] [CHUM #2] [US #77]
 1982 - "Start Tellin' the Truth" [CAN #15] [CHUM #4]
 1983 - "Girls Night Out" [CAN #14] [CHUM #19]
 1983 - "All I Need" [CAN #38] [CHUM #25]
 1984 - "Ready to Make Up" [CAN #33] [CHUM #23]
 1984 - "New Romance" [CAN #26] [CHUM #20]

References

External links 
Cyclone Records
profile at CanadianBands.com
CanadianBands.com profile of Toronto
MySpace Fan Page

1953 births
Living people
American women singers
American rock singers
Canadian women rock singers
21st-century American women